Traditional settlements in Greece are considered those settlements that have retained their unchanged image of the past, as well as their local character. The traditional settlements designated by law in Greece exceed 800. Around 830 traditional settlements have been designated under the responsibility of the Ministry for the Environment, Physical Planning and Public Works, while the Deputy Minister for Macedonia and Thrace and the Ministry for the Aegean also have the authority to declare traditional settlements.

The following is a list of traditional settlements in Greece:

Aetolia-Acarnania 
Nafpaktos

Argolis 
Argos (part of the city)
Ermioni (Mandrakia beach, Bisti)
Karia
Nafplio

Arcadia

Attica Region

Attica 
Athens (historical center)
Commercial center of Athens
Exarcheia-Mouseio-Strefi Hill
Laurium (part of the city)
Kifissia (part of the city)
Metaxourgeio
Nea Filadelfeia (refugee settlement)
Plaka
Psyri-Omonoia square area
Thiseio

Lists of populated places in Greece